Dan Weisse is an American college basketball coach, currently the head coach for the Minnesota Crookston Golden Eagles.

Weisse is a native of Oshkosh, Wisconsin. He graduated from Oshkosh West High School and then went on to play collegiate basketball for the Milwaukee Panthers and graduated with a degree in secondary education. After his playing days were over, he became a graduate assistant at the University of Wisconsin–La Crosse for the 2004–05 season. For the following two seasons he became a graduate assistant at Middle Tennessee State University. Weisse was then hired as an assistant coach at North Dakota State University under head coach Saul Phillips. He served there for four seasons before being hired as an assistant coach at Minnesota State University–Moorhead where he served for three seasons. In 2014 he was hired as the head coach at the University of Minnesota Crookston. In the last seven seasons, Weisse has accumulated an overall record of 58–132.

Weisse has a wife named Andrea and three children named Makenna, Ethan, and Addison.

Head Coaching Record

References

North Dakota State Bison men's basketball coaches
Year of birth missing (living people)
Living people
American men's basketball coaches
American men's basketball players
Basketball coaches from Wisconsin
Minnesota State–Moorhead Dragons men's basketball coaches
Middle Tennessee Blue Raiders men's basketball coaches
University of Wisconsin–Milwaukee alumni
Milwaukee Panthers men's basketball players